Gabriel Marselis (1609 – buried 5 April 1673) was a Danish tradesman and land owner. He was born in Hamburg, the son of the immigrated Dutch merchant Gabriel Marselis Sr. (c. 1575–1643), and was a brother of Selius Marselis. He settled in Amsterdam in 1634 and married the year after. The couple had three sons. In 1655 he remarried. 

His trading with King Christian IV of Denmark-Norway was partly paid with the Crown's properties and goods. Marselis thus became the owner of several iron works and copper works in Norway, and also became one of the largest landowners in Denmark and Norway. Among his sons were Vilhelm, Baron and ancestor of the noble family Güldencrone, and Constantin, Baron of Marselisborg and Constantinsborg at Aarhus in Denmark.

References

1609 births
1673 deaths
Businesspeople from Amsterdam
17th-century Dutch businesspeople
17th-century Danish businesspeople
Dutch landowners
17th-century landowners